Dana Jaster is a Paralympic athlete from the United States, competing mainly in the category J4 high jump and TS2,4 sprint events.

Jaster competed in the 1992 Paralympics for the United States winning two medals, including one silver and one bronze. At his first games in 1992, he placed second in the TS2,4 4x100, alongside his teammates Dennis Oehler, Joe Gaetani, and Tony Volpentest. He also placed third in the J4 high jump with an American record in class 46 with a distance of 1.75 meters.

References

Living people
Year of birth missing (living people)
Paralympic track and field athletes of the United States
Athletes (track and field) at the 1992 Summer Paralympics
Paralympic silver medalists for the United States
Paralympic bronze medalists for the United States
American male sprinters
American male high jumpers
Medalists at the 1992 Summer Paralympics
Paralympic medalists in athletics (track and field)
Sprinters with limb difference
High jumpers with limb difference
Paralympic sprinters
Paralympic high jumpers
20th-century American people